Aleksandra Hornik (born 17 December 1996) is a Polish orienteer. She was born in Poznań.

Career
As a junior, she won a silver medal in the middle at the 2016 Junior World Championships in Engadin.

References

1996 births
Living people
Polish orienteers
Female orienteers
Foot orienteers
Competitors at the 2017 World Games
Junior World Orienteering Championships medalists
Competitors at the 2022 World Games